The 2011 Utah Blaze season was the fifth season for the franchise in the Arena Football League. The team was coached by Ron James and moved back to EnergySolutions Arena for home games, after playing at Maverik Center in 2010. The Blaze finished the season 9–9, missing the playoffs.

Standings

Regular season schedule
The Blaze had a bye week in Week 1, and began the season the following week at home against the Tampa Bay Storm on March 17. Their final regular season game was on July 22 on the road against the Cleveland Gladiators.

Regular season

Week 1: BYE

Week 2: vs. Tampa Bay Storm

Week 3: at Orlando Predators

Week 4: vs. Dallas Vigilantes

Week 5: at San Jose SaberCats

Week 6: vs. Spokane Shock

Week 7: at Arizona Rattlers

Week 8: BYE

Week 9: at Georgia Force

Week 10: vs. Milwaukee Mustangs

Week 11: vs. San Jose SaberCats

Week 12: at Iowa Barnstormers

Week 13: vs. Arizona Rattlers

Week 14: at Tulsa Talons

Week 15: vs. Pittsburgh Power

Week 16: vs. Kansas City Command

Week 17: at Chicago Rush

Week 18: at Spokane Shock

Week 19: vs. New Orleans VooDoo

Week 20: at Cleveland Gladiators

References

Utah Blaze
Utah Blaze seasons
Utah